Coran of Portmark is a hill in the Rhinns of Kells, a sub-range of the Galloway Hills range, part of the Southern Uplands of Scotland. The most northerly Donald of the range, it is climbed from a number of directions; most commonly from Garryhorn near Carsphairn, often the first hill of a full traverse of the ridge. An old settlement to the west lends its name to the hill.

References

Mountains and hills of the Southern Uplands
Mountains and hills of Dumfries and Galloway
Donald mountains